Kampung Baru may refer to several places:
Kampung Baru, Kuala Lumpur, an area in Kuala Lumpur, Malaysia
The Kampung Baru LRT station serving the area
Kampung Baru, Pasar Rebo, an administrative village of Pasar Rebo, East Jakarta, Indonesia
Any of the New Villages set up to keep the local Chinese during the Malayan Emergency

See also
Kampung Bahru, a subdistrict located in Batu Pahat District, Johor, Malaysia